Death to False Metal is a compilation album by American rock band Weezer, released on November 2, 2010 by Geffen Records. The album comprises several previously unreleased tracks from throughout Weezer's career, with vocalist and guitarist Rivers Cuomo stating that the songs together make an album that should "logically follow Hurley". The album debuted at number 48 on the US Billboard 200.

The album was released simultaneously with the deluxe edition of the band's second studio album, Pinkerton (1996). The title comes from a phrase coined by Manowar.

Background and recording
Originally known as Odds and Ends, the album was first mentioned by guitarist Brian Bell during the summer of 2008. Vocalist and guitarist Rivers Cuomo states that the tracks are "great songs, great recordings, but for some reason they didn't make the final cut for a record. And like the Alone record, they span a vast period of time from the very beginning of our career in the early '90s right up to the present day."

Frontman Rivers Cuomo considers Death to False Metal to be Weezer's ninth studio album. Band webmaster and historian Karl Koch describes the release differently as "a special album, [...] sort of like Weezer's version of Rivers' Alone records."

The version of "Mykel & Carli" on the iTunes version of the album differs from the previously released version on the "Undone – The Sweater Song" single in 1994 and later the deluxe edition of the band's self-titled 1994 debut. It has been speculated by fans that it is the original 1993 recording of the song from The Blue Album sessions, with the more common previously released version known to have been recorded in the summer of 1994.

The album's opening track, "Turning Up the Radio", is the product of Rivers Cuomo's YouTube songwriting project Let's Write a Sawng, a process where the frontman curated a 15-step program where people were free to submit ideas such as titles, chord progressions and melodies to create a collaborative song through the video-sharing platform. The resulting song has seventeen co-writers and involves tracks recorded across various locations.

On September 25, 2014 it was announced that the album would be available on vinyl for the first time.

The cover art for the album mimics that of a religious tract from Jehovah's Witnesses featuring an artist's impression of a perfect planet Earth.

Reception

According to Metacritic, Death to False Metal has received mixed reviews, receiving an average score of 56/100.

AllMusic gave the album 4 out of 5 stars, saying "It's a wonder why a few of these cuts didn't pop up before this, but as a collection of outtakes, they hold together better than some of the band's proper albums." Drowned in Sound gave it a 4 out of 10, calling it "lineage of dumbed down music to even more dumb lyrics", citing songs such as "Blowin' My Stack" and "Trampoline". IGN gave it a 7.5 out of 10, citing "...the album feels a lot more cohesive than similar rarities sets, though a little more diversity would have made for a more interesting listen."

Track listing

 "Unbreak My Heart" originally performed by Toni Braxton.
 "Yellow Camaro" exclusive Japanese track.
 "Mykel and Carli" unreleased version from [[Weezer (1994 album)|''The Blue Albums]] sessions.

PersonnelWeezer Rivers Cuomo – lead vocals, guitar, keyboard
 Patrick Wilson – drums, percussion
 Brian Bell – guitar, backing vocals, synth, keyboard
 Scott Shriner – bass, backing vocalsAdditional musicians David Campbell – string arrangements, conducting
 Taylor Morden – guitar, synthesizer, backing vocalsDesign Andy Mueller – art direction
 Robert Pitt – cover painting, paintings
 Daniel Field, Karl Koch, Sean Murphy, Spike Jonze – photographyProduction'''
 Chad Bamford – engineer
 Shawn Everett – engineer, mixing
 Taylor Morden – engineer, production
 Rich Mouser – engineer
 Rick Rubin – engineer
 Jim Scott – engineer
 Dave Collins– mastering
 Marc McClusky – mixing (tracks: 1 to 3)

References

External links

Death to False Metal at YouTube (streamed copy where licensed)
 
 

Weezer albums
2010 compilation albums
DGC Records albums